C/ (PanSTARRS) is a comet, inner Oort cloud object. On 30 January 2016, it was classified as a comet when it was 5.7 AU from the Sun. It comes close to Jupiter, and a close approach in the past threw it on the distant orbit it is on now.

Though the comet nucleus was probably mildly active, early asteroidal estimates gave an absolute magnitude (H) of 12.3, which would suggest a nucleus as large as 8–20 km in diameter. But it could easily be half that size due to activity brightening the nucleus.

2017 perihelion
C/ was discovered on 15 March 2015 when it was 8.44 AU from the Sun, and magnitude 21.5. By early February 2016, the object reached magnitude 20, and made a close approach to Jupiter on 28 March 2016 of 0.9245 AU. This changed its orbit, significantly decreasing its aphelion distance from 1430 AU to ~1200 AU, and as it passed through the inner Solar System its aphelion decreased to 770 AU, and by 2020 it had an aphelion of 854 AU.

The barycentric orbital period will decrease from 19000 years (epoch 1950) to 9000 years (epoch 2050).

As of January 2017, it was magnitude 13, and increasing in brightness. On 4 April 2017, it was detected outbursting to magnitude 6.5. On 19 April 2017, it reached its closest point to Earth of ~1.2 AU. At this point, it was about apparent magnitude 8, and, assuming a size of 20 km, have an apparent size of 19 mas. It came to perihelion (closest approach to the Sun) on 10 May 2017. It will not be 50 AU from the Sun until 2045.

Orbital elements table

Comparison

See also
 List of Solar System objects by greatest aphelion

Notes
 assuming an inactive nucleus and a comet-like albedo of 0.05

 Because 's orbit takes it so far from the Sun, a more accurate value for its orbit is a barycentric solution. Additionally, a close approach to Jupiter in 2016, and a travel through the inner solar system in 2017 drastically changes its orbit. Therefore, orbits for 2000–2016 and 2018–2100 are provided, respectively.

References

External links 
 

Comets in 2017
Cometary object articles
Non-periodic comets
Inner Oort cloud
20150315
Discoveries by Pan-STARRS